Wilfried Auerbach (born 17 March 1960) is an Austrian rower. He competed at the 1980 Summer Olympics and the 1984 Summer Olympics.

References

1960 births
Living people
Austrian male rowers
Olympic rowers of Austria
Rowers at the 1980 Summer Olympics
Rowers at the 1984 Summer Olympics
Sportspeople from Upper Austria
People from Ried im Innkreis District